Vincent Muldoon (born 12 October 1990) is an Irish former professional snooker player. After being a successful junior player (he was a European Under-19 Championship finalist in 2007), he became a professional in 2008. Despite some good performances throughout the 2008–09 season, including losing narrowly 8–10 to Jimmy White in the second qualifying round of the 2009 World Championship, he fell off the tour.

Performance and rankings timeline

Tournament finals

Amateur finals

References

Living people
Irish snooker players
1990 births